Las Reinas Del Pueblo (English: Queens of The Town)  is a 1995 greatest hits album featuring six songs of Selena and six songs of Graciela Beltrán. This album peaked at number 4 on the Billboard Top Latin Albums spent 38 weeks on the chart.

Track listing 
 Como La Flor – (with Selena)
 Baraja de Oro – (with Graciela Beltrán)
 No Debes Jugar – (with Selena)
 Pilares de Cristal – (with Graciela Beltrán)
 Bidi Bidi Bom Bom – (with Selena)
 Tú Me Dijiste Adiós – (with Graciela Beltrán)
 La Llamada – (with Selena)
 Mi Triunfo – (with Graciela Beltrán)
 ¿Qué Creías? – (with Selena)
 Tu Recado – (with Graciela Beltrán)
 La Carcacha – (with Selena)
 Morena y Delgadita – (with Graciela Beltrán)

Charts

References

 https://www.billboard.com/charts/latin-albums/1995-05-06
 https://www.billboard.com/charts/latin-albums/1996-01-20

1995 greatest hits albums
Selena compilation albums
Albums recorded at Q-Productions